Juanacatlán is a town and municipio (municipality) in the central region of the Mexican state of Jalisco.

Origin of name
Juanacatlán gets its name from the Nahuatl word "Xonacatlan", which means place abundant in onions or onion place (from "Xonaca" for onions and "Tlan" for place).

The hieroglyph of Juanacatlán includes the symbol of the Tlaxcala, representing the battles and the places where the Tlaxcaltecans went with the Nuño de Guzmán expedition, after the conquest of Mexico.

Seal
The seal of Juanacatlán is based on the region's economic activities and history, and is divided into four parts:

In the center: Nahuatl ideogram of Tlaxcala, which signifies “Xonacatlan” in the indigenous vocabulary, from which is derived the name of the population.
Upper left: This section includes symbols of the principal economic activity of the region, agriculture, and presents the basic products produced: wheat and corn, against a base of stone, and the image of Papantón hill, a monumental figure from the countryside that dominates the municipio.
Upper right: at the base are the arches of the first public building of the area, that of the Municipal President, and in front, the Cross of Cantera, monument upon whose rectangular faces are inscribed the date of the foundation of the region's population.
Lower part: As a memory of the past, the celebrated waterfall of El Salto de Juanacatlán, today almost gone, but once a monument that gave the region national recognition.

The leaves that surround the seal are identical to those in the seal of Jalisco, whose people Juanacatlán joins as a national entity. The seal was approved by H. Cabildo de Juanacatlán in 1993. Its creation was the responsibility of the teacher María de Lourdes Torres Alaniz, from the Municipality of Juanacatlán.

History
Although "place of onions" has been claimed to be a necessarily inappropriate translation of the indigenous name (as the onions were brought by the conquistadors), the origin of the name was in fact a different, native, plant- a type of jicama or cebollita as is commonly known in the region.  The Jalisco writer Juan José Arreola translates the name as "place of the good onions".

In prehispanic times, the Xonacatlan region was part of the Tololotlán kingdom, which was itself part of the feudal Tonalá kingdom, one of four kingdoms that composed the Chimalhuacana federation.

In 1529, Nuño de Guzmán arrived in the area, while conquering the kingdoms of Tonalá and Xalisco. Later, the people of Coyula, Juanacatlán, Tatepozco and Tololotlán (because their populations were so small) were defeated. On March 25, 1530, Nuño de Guzmán took formal possession of the territory in the name of the Spanish monarch.

Beginning in 1531, the natives of the Xonacatlán region were converted and evangelized in the Christian faith by the religious order of San Francisco: Friar Antonio de Segovia, Fray Juan de Padilla, Fray Andrés de Córdova and Juan de Badillo. That same year, Father Segovia founded the convent of Our Lady of the Assumption in Tetlán, near modern-day Guadalajara.

Geography
The municipio of Juanacatlán in the east-central part of the state, between 20º24’00’’ and 20º32’15’’ northern latitude and between 103º03’10’’ and 103º15’00’’ west latitude, at an altitude of 1,530m.

It is bordered to the north by Tonalá and Zapotlanejo, to the south by Chapala and Poncitlán; to the east by Zapotlán del Rey, and to the west by Ixtlahuacán de los Membrillos, El Salto, and Tlajomulco de Zuñiga.

Notable residents
 Saúl "Canelo" Álvarez – Mexican Boxer, Middleweight champion.
 Rigoberto Álvarez – Mexican Boxer, a contender in the Middleweight division.

Climate
The climate of the municipio is semi-dry in winter, with dry summers, and somewhat hot without a defined winter pattern. The average annual temperature is 20.1 °C, and the average annual precipitation is 819.1 mm, with a rainy season from June to August.

The dominant winds are from the east, west, and south. There's an average of 12 freezing days per year.

Hydrography
The region's hydrography includes the Santiago River, which surrounds much of the town, and the streams that flow in the rainy season: the Colorado, Buenavista Los Corteses, La Cruz, la Tinaja, El Gallo, El Puerto, Hondo, Miseria, Chiquito, Lomelines, and Limoncillo.

There is also the Santiago River Channel and the irrigation channel deriving from the Corona Dam.

The municipio's water resources belong to the town Lerma-Chapala-Santiago basin and the Verde-Atotonilco sub-basin.
Since companies appearing in the industrial corridor of El Salto have polluted the waters, the waterfall that once attracted hundreds of visitors is now a hotbed of infection, with a terrible odor, worse in times of heat. This has led to the appearance of respiratory diseases, various cancers, and heart disease. The Rio Lerma and Rio Santiago have become the most serious threats among the populations of El Salto and Juanacatlán.

Many people of Jalisco blame former President Vicente Fox's completed project, The El Cajón Dam, a hydroelectric dam on the Río Grande de Santiago in the Mexican state of Nayarit.

Natural resources
The region benefits from a natural wealth including a 933 ha forest with species such as oak, oak, ash and Tabachines, mainly.

Its main mineral resources are sandbars. Among the species of fauna are mountain lions, rabbits, squirrels, skunks, foxes, snakes, coyotes and armadillos. The soils belong to the dominant type "Vertisol pélico" and "Regosol eútrico" and the associated soil type "Feozem háplico".

In the forested region are species such as oak, giant oak, Tabachines and ash. There are also minor species such as: guamúchil, bell, captain, tepamé, mesquite, nopal, huizache, and a variety of fruit trees.

Economy
The region's key local crops are maize and sorghum. It breeds cattle, producing meat and milk, and breeds pigs, sheep, goats, horses, poultry meat and postura and colmenas. The main branch of industry is manufacturing.

Fishing in the Rio Santiago produces species such as catfish, lobina, carp and frog on a small scale for local consumption.

The Juanacatlán Lagoon offers a landscape worthy of admiration, for the transparency of its water and vegetation, with a surrounding forest of conifers.

The municipal seat provides financial, professional, technical, communal, social, personal and maintenance services.

Government

Municipal presidents

References

Municipalities of Jalisco